Chevalier du Plessis was a French pirate active in the West Indies in the 1660s. Du Plessis allowed fellow privateer Moïse Vauquelin to work on board and when he died in 1668, Vauquelin succeeded him as captain.

References 

French pirates
Caribbean pirates
17th-century pirates
1668 deaths